Ficus virgata, commonly known as figwood, is a tree in the family Moraceae, native to areas of Southeast Asia and the western Pacific. It grows as a strangler on other trees, eventually smothering and killing its host.

Conservation
This species is listed by the Queensland Department of Environment and Science as least concern. , it has not been assessed by the IUCN.

Gallery

References

External links
 
 
 View a map of historical sightings of this species at the Australasian Virtual Herbarium
 View observations of this species on iNaturalist
 View images of this species on Flickriver

virgata
Flora of Queensland
Taxa named by Carl Ludwig Blume
Taxa described in 1825